The Law of the Desert (German: Das Gesetz der Wüste) is a 1920 German silent adventure film directed by Fred Sauer and starring Bernhard Goetzke and Heinrich Peer.

The film's sets were designed by the art director Fritz Lederer.

Cast
Josef Commer
Bernhard Goetzke
Emil Mamelok
Heinrich Peer
Henri Peters-Arnolds
Josefine Dora
Editha Seidel

References

External links

Films of the Weimar Republic
Films directed by Fred Sauer
German silent feature films
1920 adventure films
German adventure films
German black-and-white films
Silent adventure films
1920s German films